A general election was held in the U.S. state of Alabama on November 6, 2018. All Alabama executive officers were up for election along with all of Alabama's seven seats in the United States House of Representatives. Primary elections took place on June 5, 2018, for both major parties.

Governor

Incumbent Republican Governor Kay Ivey, who assumed the office upon the resignation of Robert J. Bentley in April 2017, ran for election to a full term against Tuscaloosa Mayor Walt Maddox and independent write-in Chad Chig Martin. Kay Ivey won with 60% of the votes.

Lieutenant Governor
The office of Lieutenant Governor was vacant prior to the election.

State House Representative Will Ainsworth, State Senator Rusty Glover, and Public Service Commission President Twinkle Cavanaugh were running for the Republican nomination.
Dr. Will Boyd from Florence ran unopposed for the Democratic nomination.

Democratic primary
 Will Boyd, pastor and candidate for U.S. Senate in 2017

Primary results

Republican primary
 Will Ainsworth, state representative
 Twinkle Cavanaugh, president of the Public Service Commission
 Rusty Glover, state senator

Primary results

Runoff results

General election

Polling

Results

Attorney General
Former Alabama Attorney General Troy King unsuccessfully sought the Republican nomination.

Incumbent Republican Attorney General Steve Marshall, who was appointed by Governor Bentley in February 2017 after appointing Attorney General Luther Strange to the U.S. Senate, ran for a first full term.

Former chief deputy attorney general Alice Martin sought the Republican nomination.

Attorney Joseph Siegelman, son of former governor Don Siegelman, is the nominee of the Democratic Party.

Chris Christie ran for attorney general on the Democratic ballot. Christie has been a trial lawyer at Bradley Arant Boult Cummings for 30 years.

Democratic primary
 Chris Christie, trial lawyer at Bradley Arant Boult Cummings
 Joseph Siegelman, son of former governor Don Siegelman

Primary results

Republican primary
 Chess Bedsole, chairman of Donald Trump's Alabama campaign
 Troy King, former Alabama Attorney General
 Steve Marshall, incumbent
 Alice Martin, Deputy Attorney General of Alabama and former U.S. Attorney for the Northern District of Alabama

Primary results

Runoff results

General election

Polling

Results

Secretary of State
Incumbent Republican Secretary of State John Merrill ran for re-election to a second term.

Democratic primary
 Lula Albert
 Heather Milam

Primary results

Republican primary
 Michael Johnson
 John Merrill, incumbent

Primary results

General election

Polling

Results
Governing magazine projected the race as "safe Republican".

State Auditor
Incumbent Republican State Auditor Jim Zeigler was running for re-election to a second term.

Democratic primary
 Miranda Joseph

Primary results

Republican primary
 Stan Cooke
 Elliott Lipinsky
 Jim Zeigler, incumbent

Primary results

General election

Results

State Treasurer
Incumbent Republican State Treasurer Young Boozer was term-limited and could not run for re-election to a third consecutive term.

Democratic primary
No Democratic candidates filed to run in the primary.

Republican primary
 David Black
 Stephen Evans
 John McMillan, Commissioner of Agriculture and Industries

Primary results

General election

Results

Commissioner of Agriculture and Industries
Incumbent Republican Commissioner of Agriculture and Industries John McMillan was term-limited and could not run for re-election to a third consecutive term.  The Republican candidates are Lowndesboro Mayor and Lowndes County GOP chairman Rick Pate, former FBI field intelligence supervisor T. O. (Tracy) Crane, State Senator Gerald Dial, and Cecil Murphy.

Democratic primary
No Democratic candidates filed to run in the primary.

Republican primary
 Tracy Crane, former FBI field intelligence supervisor
 Gerald Dial, state senator
 Cecil Murphy
 Rick Pate, Lowndesboro Mayor and Lowndes County GOP chairman

Primary results

Runoff results

General election

Results

Public Service Commission
The two associate commissioner seats on the Alabama Public Service Commission was up for election.  Incumbent Republican commissioners Jeremy Oden, who was appointed to the commission by Governor Bentley in December 2012, and Chip Beeker, who was first elected in 2014, were both eligible to run for re-election.

Place 1 Democratic primary
 Cara McClure

Primary results

Place 1 Republican primary
 Jim Bonner
 Jeremy Oden, incumbent

Primary results

Place 1 general election

Results

Place 2 Democratic primary
 Kari Powell

Primary results

Place 2 Republican primary
 Chip Beeker, incumbent 
 Robin Litaker

Primary results

Place 2 general election

Results

Alabama State Legislature

Every member of the Alabama state legislature was up for election in 2018. Both state senators and state representatives serve four-year terms in Alabama. After the 2014 elections, Republicans maintained control of both chambers. In 2018, all 35 Alabama Senate seats and all 105 Alabama House of Representatives seats were up for election. These seats will not be contested in a regularly-scheduled election again until 2022.

The outcome of this election could affect partisan balance during post-2020 census redistricting.

Senate
Republicans won 27 while Democrats won 8 seats. The Republican Party gained 1 seat, the 29th, which was held by an retiring independent who caucused with the Republicans.

House of Representatives
Republicans won 77 seats while Democrats won 28 seats. The Republican Party gained 5 seats.

United States House of Representatives

All of Alabama's seven seats in the United States House of Representatives were up for election in 2018. 6 Republicans and 1 Democrat were returned. No districts changed hands.

Ballot measures

Amendment 1

Amendment 2

Amendment 3

Amendment 4

References

External links
Candidates at Vote Smart 
Candidates at Ballotpedia
Campaign finance at OpenSecrets

Official lieutenant gubernatorial campaign websites
Will Ainsworth (R) for Lt. Governor
Will Boyd (D) for Lt. Governor

Official attorney general campaign websites
Steve Marshall (R) for Attorney General
Joseph Siegelman (D) for Attorney General

Official Secretary of State campaign websites
Heather Milam (D) for Secretary of State

Official State Auditor campaign websites
Miranda Joseph (D) for State Auditor

Official place 1 public service commission websites
Cara McClure (D) for Public Service Commission

Official place 2 public service commission websites 
Kari Powell (D) for Public Service Commission

 
Alabama
Alabama elections by year